The Halalt First Nation (Halkomelem Language: xeláltxw) is a First Nations tribe located on a reservation near Chemainus in southeastern Vancouver Island, British Columbia, Canada.  The historical territory of the Halalt people is the lower Chemainus River Valley and Willy Island, which is offshore from today's town of Chemainus.

The Halalt First Nation is a member government of the Naut'sa Mawt Tribal Council, and affiliated with the Hul'qumi'num Treaty Group

See also
Hul'qumi'num (language)

External links
Halalt First Nation
Naut'sa mawt Tribal Council website
Halalt page - Hul’qumi’num Treaty Group website

Coast Salish governments
Mid Vancouver Island